The 2006 Four Nations Tournament was the sixth edition of the Four Nations Tournament, an invitational women's football tournament held in China. The venue for this edition of the tournament was Guangdong Olympic Stadium, in the city of Guangzhou.

Participants

Venues

Final standings

Match results

References 

2006 in women's association football
2006
2006 in Chinese football
2005–06 in French women's football
2006 in Norwegian women's football
2006 in American women's soccer
January 2006 sports events in Asia
2006 in Chinese women's sport